Raymond Demont Austin (born December 21, 1974) is a former American football strong safety in the National Football League. He played college football at Tennessee and was drafted by the New York Jets in the fifth round of the 1997 NFL Draft. He also played for the Chicago Bears in the NFL and the Chicago Enforcers of the XFL. In 2017 he started the Fan Controlled Sports League and is currently the league Commissioner.

Besides his association with sports, he has been acting since 2005 with roles on Prison Break, Detroit 1-8-7, Chicago Fire, Chicago P.D. and Empire.

Fan Controlled Sports & Entertainment 

In 2017, Ray became one of the founders of Fan Controlled Football (FCF). FCF raised $3m from angels investors, $12m in a pre-seed, and $40m in a Series A in 2020 with Lightspeed Ventures leading the seed round, Animoca Brands and Delphi Digital leading the Series A. The league had its first season in 2021 with 4 teams playing 12 games each. In 2022, the league grew to 8 teams and announced a new broadcast deal with NBCUniversal subsidiary NBCLX and Peacock to broadcast every game of the 2022 season.

Ray currently serves as the FCF league Commissioner.

ATHLYT
Ray is a co-founder and Chief Brand Officer of ATHLYT, a startup looking to connect college athletes with advertisers. In 2022 the NCAA began allowing student athletes to profit from their name, image and, likeness (NIL) which allowed companies like ATHLYT to start helping college student athletes to start earning from their NIL.

Filmography

NFL Statistics

Tennessee Volunteers Stats

References

External links

Ray Austin @ ESPN

1974 births
Living people
Players of American football from Greensboro, North Carolina
American football defensive backs
Tennessee Volunteers football players
Chicago Enforcers players
New York Jets players
Chicago Bears players

Participants in American reality television series
American male television actors